Lummene (also Lummenne) is a lake in Finland in the municipality of Kuhmoinen in the Central Finland region.

The lake is a bifurcation lake. One outflow from it is eastwards into the lake Päijänne, which is a part of Kymijoki basin and drains into the Gulf of Finland. Other outflow is into lake Vehkajärvi and from there into lake Vesijako that also is a bifurcation lake. From lake Vesijako there are two outflows: one eastwards into lake Päijänne and another outflow westwards through a chain of lakes that consists of the lakes Kuohijärvi, Kukkia, Iso-Roine, Hauhonselkä and Ilmoilanselkä, and ends into lake Mallasvesi, from which the waters flow through Vanajavesi and Pyhäjärvi towards Kokemäenjoki and the Gulf of Bothnia in the west.

Lake Lummene has inspired cosmetics producer company Lumene to choose its trademark name.

References

 Not Any Usual Route (About bifurcation lakes in Finland)

Kuhmoinen
Kokemäenjoki basin
Kymi basin
Bifurcation lakes
Lakes of Padasjoki